Jean-Christophe Savignoni (born 6 August 1966) is a French former professional cross-country mountain biker. He most notably won European Cross-country Championships and the French national cross-country championships in 1995. He was also a high level triathlete and runner, having competed at the Boston and Berlin Marathon.

Major results

1992
 2nd Roc d'Azur
1993
 2nd Roc d'Azur
1994
 1st Roc d'Azur
1995
 1st  European XCO Championships
 1st  National XCO Championships

References

External links

Living people
French mountain bikers
1966 births
French male cyclists
People from Fort-de-France